Sarayly (Haraylı) is a rural locality (a village) in Balyshlinsky Selsoviet, Blagovarsky District, Bashkortostan, Russia. The population was 264 as of 2010. There are 3 streets.

Geography 
Sarayly is located 24 km south of Yazykovo (the district's administrative centre) by road. Balyshly is the nearest rural locality.

References 

Rural localities in Blagovarsky District